Lauryn Noelle Hill (born May 26, 1975) is an American singer, songwriter, rapper, record producer and actress. She is often regarded as one of the greatest rappers of all time, as well as one of the most influential musicians of her generation. Hill is credited for breaking barriers for female rappers, popularizing melodic rapping and for bringing hip hop and neo soul to popular music. She is known for being the frontwoman of The Fugees, and for her 1998 solo album The Miseducation of Lauryn Hill, which became one of the best-selling albums of all time. Hill has won many accolades, including eight Grammy Awards, the most for a female rapper to this day.

Hill starred in the film Sister Act 2: Back in the Habit (1993). She later formed the group Fugees. The group released two albums, including The Score (1996), which spawned the hit single "Killing Me Softly", with Hill on lead vocals. It won the Grammy Award for Best Rap Album, making her the first woman to win the award. Afterwards, Hill collaborated with Nas on "If I Ruled the World (Imagine That)", bandmate Wyclef Jean on his version of "Guantanamera" alongside Celia Cruz, and composed "A Rose Is Still a Rose" for Aretha Franklin. The band split in 1997, and soon after she began work on her solo album.

Her sole studio album The Miseducation of Lauryn Hill debuted at No. 1 on the U.S. Billboard 200, with the highest first-week sales for a debut album by a woman in the 20th century. It included the songs "Ex-Factor" and "Lost Ones". The lead single "Doo Wop (That Thing)" debuted at No. 1 on the Billboard Hot 100,Also well as the song "To Zion" which is about her son with Rohan Marley and made her the first artist to have debuted at No. 1 on both the Billboard 200 and Hot 100 with their first entries, and the first female rapper to earn a No. 1 on each chart. At the 41st Grammy Awards, Hill set a record for the most nominations in one night for a woman, with ten. She won five awards including Album of the Year, and became the first hip hop act to win the award. The album was later selected for the Library of Congress' National Recording Registry. Hill produced music for Santana and Mary J. Blige, prior to releasing the new-material live album MTV Unplugged No. 2.0 (2002), which was certified platinum by the RIAA.

She proceeded to drop out of the public eye, only periodically releasing singles, such as "Nobody" with Nas. Billboard ranked her seventh on their "10 Best Rappers of All Time" list (2015), with her being the only woman on the list. Named one of the Greatest Singers of All Time by Consequence of Sound and Rolling Stone; her music (both solo and with The Fugees) has appeared on the latter's list of 500 Greatest Songs and Albums. Hill has earned several Guinness World Records, which include being the first woman rapper to earn a Diamond-certification by RIAA. She has received the NAACP's President's Award, and has been inducted into the Black Music & Entertainment Walk of Fame.

Early life
Lauryn Noelle Hill was born on May 26, 1975, in East Orange, New Jersey. Her mother, Valerie Hill, was an English teacher and her father, Mal Hill, a computer and management consultant. She has one older brother named Malaney who was born in 1972. Her Baptist family moved to New York for a short period before settling in South Orange, New Jersey.

Hill has said of her musically oriented family: "there were so many records, so much music constantly being played. My mother played the piano, my father sang, and we were always surrounded by music." Her father sang in local nightclubs and at weddings. While growing up, Hill frequently listened to Curtis Mayfield, Stevie Wonder, Aretha Franklin, and Gladys Knight; years later she recalled playing Marvin Gaye's What's Going On repeatedly until she fell asleep to it.

In middle school, Lauryn Hill performed "The Star-Spangled Banner" before a basketball game. Due to its popularity, subsequent games featured a recording of her rendition. In 1988, Hill appeared as an Amateur Night contestant on It's Showtime at the Apollo. She sang her version of the Smokey Robinson track "Who's Lovin' You", garnering an initially harsh reaction from the crowd. She persevered through the performance.

Hill attended Columbia High School, where she was a member of the track team, cheerleading squad and was a classmate of actor Zach Braff. She also took violin lessons, went to dance class, and founded the school's gospel choir. Academically, she took advanced placement classes and received primarily 'A' grades. School officials recognized her as a leader among the student body. Later recalling her education, Hill commented, "I had a love for—I don't know if it was necessarily for academics, more than it just was for achieving, period. If it was academics, if it was sports, if it was music, if it was dance, whatever it was, I was always driven to do a lot in whatever field or whatever area I was focusing on at the moment."

Career

1991–1993: Career beginnings
While a freshman in high school, through mutual friends, Prakazrel "Pras" Michel approached Hill about a music group he was creating. Hill and Pras began under the name Translator Crew. They came up with this name because they wanted to rhyme in different languages. Another female vocalist was soon replaced by Michel's cousin, multi-instrumentalist Wyclef Jean. The group began performing in local showcases and high school talent shows. Hill was initially only a singer, but then learned to rap too; instead of modeling herself on female rappers like Salt-N-Pepa and MC Lyte, she preferred male rappers like Ice Cube and developed her flow from listening to them. Hill later said, "I remember doing my homework in the bathroom stalls of hip-hop clubs."

While growing up, Hill took acting lessons in Manhattan. She began her acting career in 1991 appearing with Jean in Club XII, MC Lyte's Off-Broadway hip-hop rendering of Shakespeare's Twelfth Night. While the play was not a success, an agent noticed her. Later that year, Hill began appearing on the soap opera As the World Turns in a recurring role as troubled teenager Kira Johnson. She subsequently co-starred alongside Whoopi Goldberg in the 1993 release Sister Act 2: Back in the Habit, playing Rita Louise Watson, an inner-city Catholic school teenager with a surly, rebellious attitude. In it, she performed the songs "His Eye Is on the Sparrow" (a duet with Tanya Blount) and "Joyful, Joyful".

Director Bill Duke credited Hill with improvising a rap in a scene: "None of that was scripted. That was all Lauryn. She was amazing." Critic Roger Ebert called her "the girl with the big joyful voice", although he thought her talent was wasted, while Rolling Stone said she "performed marvelously against type ... in the otherwise perfunctory [film]". Hill also appeared in Steven Soderbergh's 1993 motion picture King of the Hill, in a minor but pivotal role as a 1930s gum-popping elevator operator. Soderbergh biographer Jason Wood described her as supplying one of the warmest scenes in the film. Hill graduated from Columbia High School in 1993.

1994–1996: The Fugees

Blunted on reality and The Score
Pras, Hill and Jean renamed their group Fugees, a derivative of the word "refugee", which was a derogatory term for Haitian Americans. Hill began a romantic relationship with Jean. The Fugees, who signed a contract with Columbia/Ruffhouse Records in 1993, became known for their genre blending, particularly of reggae, rock and soul, which was first experimented on their debut album, Blunted on Reality, released in 1994. It reached No. 62 on the Billboard Top R&B/Hip-Hop Albums chart but overall sold poorly and was met by poor critical reviews due to their management's insistence they adopt gangsta rap attitudes. Although the album made little impact, Hill's rapping on "Some Seek Stardom" was seen as a highlight. Within the group, she was frequently referred to by the nickname "L. Boogie". Hill's image and artistry, as well as her full, rich, raspy alto voice, placed her at the forefront of the band, with some fans urging her to begin a solo career.

The Fugees' second album, The Score (1996), peaked at No. 1 on the U.S. Billboard 200 and stayed in the top ten of that chart for over half a year. It sold about seven million copies in the United States and more than 20 million copies worldwide. In the 1996 Pazz & Jop Critics Poll, The Score came second in the list of best albums and three of its tracks placed within the top 20 best singles. It won the Grammy Award for Best Rap Album, and was later included on Rolling Stones list of the 500 greatest albums of all time. The Score garnered praise for being a strong alternative to the gangsta idiom, and Hill stated, "We're trying to do something positive with the music because it seems like only the negative is rising to the top these days. It only takes a drop of purity to clean a cesspool."

Singles from The Score included "Fu-Gee-La" and "Ready or Not", which highlighted Hill's singing and rapping abilities, and the Bob Marley cover "No Woman, No Cry". Her rendition of "Killing Me Softly" became the group's breakout hit. Buttressed by what Rolling Stone publications later called Hill's "evocative" vocal line and her "amazing pipes", the track became pervasive on pop, R&B, hip hop, and adult contemporary radio formats. It won the Grammy Award for Best R&B Performance by a Duo or Group with Vocals. On the album, Hill combined African-American music and Caribbean music influences with socially conscious lyrics. Newsweek mentioned Hill's "irresistibly cute looks" and proclaimed her "the most powerful new voice in rap".

Disbandment and motherhood
At 21 years old, Hill was still living at home with her parents. She had been enrolled at Columbia University during this period, and considered majoring in history as she became a sophomore, but left after about a year of total studies once sales of The Score went into the millions. In 1996, she responded to a false rumor on The Howard Stern Show that she had made a racist comment on MTV, saying "How can I possibly be a racist? My music is universal. And I believe in God. If I believe in God, then I have to love all of God's creations. There can be no segregation."

In 1996, Hill founded the Refugee Project, a non-profit outreach organization that sought to transform the attitudes and behavior of at-risk urban youth. Part of this was Camp Hill, which offered stays in the Catskill Mountains for such youngsters; another was production of an annual Halloween haunted house in East Orange. Hill also raised money for Haitian refugees, supported clean water well-building projects in Kenya and Uganda, and staged a rap concert in Harlem to promote voter registration. A 1997 benefit event for the Refugee Project introduced a board of trustees for the organization that included Sean Combs, Mariah Carey, Busta Rhymes, Spike Lee, and others as members.

In 1997, the Fugees split to work on solo projects, which Jean later blamed on his tumultuous relationship with Hill and the fact he married his wife Claudinette while still involved with Hill. Meanwhile, in the summer of 1996 Hill had met Rohan Marley, a son of Bob Marley and a former University of Miami football player. Hill subsequently began a relationship with him, while still also involved with Jean. Hill became pregnant in late 1996, and on August 3, 1997, Marley and Hill's first child, Zion David, was born. The couple lived in Hill's childhood house in South Orange after she bought her parents a new house down the street.

Hill had a cameo appearance in the 1997 film Hav Plenty. In 1998, Hill took up another small, but important role in the film Restaurant; Entertainment Weekly praised her portrayal of the protagonist's pregnant former girlfriend as bringing vigor to the film.

1997–1999: The Miseducation of Lauryn Hill
Hill recorded her solo record The Miseducation of Lauryn Hill from late 1997 through June 1998 at Tuff Gong Studios in Jamaica. The title was inspired by the book The Mis-Education of the Negro (1933) by Carter G. Woodson and The Education of Sonny Carson, a film and autobiographical novel. The album featured contributions from D'Angelo, Carlos Santana, Mary J. Blige and the then-unknown John Legend. Wyclef Jean initially did not support Hill recording a solo album, but eventually offered his production help; Hill turned him down.

Several songs on the album concerned her frustration with the Fugees; "I Used to Love Him" dealt with the breakdown of the relationship between Hill and Wyclef Jean. Other songs such as "To Zion" spoke about her decision to have her first baby, even though many at the time encouraged her to have an abortion so to not interfere with her blossoming career. "To Zion" was written to her son, Zion David Marley, who she had with one of Bob Marley's sons, Rohan Marley. Zion was the first of 5 children they had together. Indeed, Hill's pregnancy revived her from a period of writer's block.

In terms of production, Hill collaborated with a group of musicians known as New Ark, consisting of Vada Nobles, Rasheem Pugh, Tejumold Newton, and Johari Newton. Hill later said that she wanted to "write songs that lyrically move me and have the integrity of reggae and the knock of hip-hop and the instrumentation of classic soul" and that the production on the album was intended to make the music sound raw and not computer-aided. Hill spoke of pressure from her label to emulate Prince, wherein all tracks would be credited as written and produced by the artist with little outside help. She also wanted to be appreciated as an auteur as much as Jean had within the Fugees. She also saw a feminist cause: "But step out and try and control things and there are doubts. This is a very sexist industry. They'll never throw the 'genius' title to a sister." While recording the album, when Hill was asked about providing contracts or documentation to the musicians, she replied, "We all love each other. This ain't about documents. This is blessed."

Released on August 25, 1998, the album received rave reviews from contemporary music critics, and was the most acclaimed album of 1998. Critics lauded the album's blending of the R&B, doo-wop, pop, hip-hop, and reggae genres and its honest representation of a woman's life and relationships. David Browne, writing in Entertainment Weekly, called it "an album of often-astonishing power, strength, and feeling", and praised Hill for "easily flowing from singing to rapping, evoking the past while forging a future of her own". Robert Christgau quipped, "PC record of the year—songs soft, singing ordinary, rapping skilled, rhymes up and down, skits de trop, production subtle and terrific". In 2017, NPR rated the album as the second-best album of all time created by a woman.

It sold nearly 423,000 copies in its first week (boosted by advance radio play of two non-label-sanctioned singles, "Lost Ones" and "Can't Take My Eyes Off You") and topped the Billboard 200 for four weeks and the Billboard R&B Albums chart for six weeks. It went on to sell about 10 million copies in the United States, and 20 million copies worldwide. During 1998 and 1999, Hill earned $25 million from record sales and touring. Hill, along with Blige, Missy Elliott, Meshell Ndegeocello, Erykah Badu, and others, found a voice with the neo soul genre.

The first single released from the album was "Doo Wop (That Thing)", which debuted at No. 1 on the Billboard Hot 100 chart. It exemplified Hill's appeal, combining feelings of self-empowerment with self-defense. Other charted singles from the album were "Ex-Factor", which has been sampled by Drake and Cardi B, "Everything Is Everything" and "To Zion". In the 1998 Pazz & Jop Critics Poll, Miseducation came second in the list of best albums and "Doo Wop (That Thing)" second in best singles.

In November 1998, Marley and Hill's second child, Selah Louise, was born. Of being a young mother of two, Hill said, "It's not an easy situation at all. You have to really pray and be honest with yourself."

In the run-up to the 1999 Grammy Awards, Hill became the first woman to be nominated in ten categories in a single year. In addition to Miseducation works, the nominations included her rendition of "Can't Take My Eyes Off You" for the 1997 film Conspiracy Theory, which had appeared on Billboard charts, and Hill's writing and producing of "A Rose Is Still a Rose", which became a late-in-career hit for Aretha Franklin. She appeared on several magazine covers, including Time, Esquire, Rolling Stone, Teen People, and The New York Times Fashion Magazine. During the ceremony, Hill broke another record by becoming the first woman to win five times in one night, taking home the awards for Album of the Year, Best R&B Album, Best R&B Song, Best Female R&B Vocal Performance, and Best New Artist. During an acceptance speech, she said, "This is crazy. This is hip-hop!" Hill had brought forth a new, mainstream acceptance of the genre.

In February 1999, Hill received four awards at the 30th Annual NAACP Image Awards. In May 1999, she became the youngest woman ever named to Ebony magazine's 100+ Most Influential Black Americans list; in November of that year, the same publication named her as one of "10 For Tomorrow" in the "Ebony 2000: Special Millennium Issue". In May 1999, she made People magazine's 50 Most Beautiful People list. The publication, which has called her "model-gorgeous", praised the  Hill for her idiosyncratic sense of personal style. In June 1999, she received an Essence Award, but her acceptance speech, where she said there was no contradiction in religious love and servitude and "[being] who you are, as fly and as hot and as whatever", drew reaction from those in the public who thought she was not a good role model as a young, unwed mother of two. This was a repetition of criticism she had received after the birth of her first child, and she had said that she and Marley would soon be married. In early 2000, Hill was one of the producers to share the Grammy Award for Album of the Year awarded for Santana's 1999 multi-million-selling Supernatural, whereon she had written, produced, and rapped on the track "Do You Like the Way" (a rumination on the direction the world was headed, it also featured the singing of CeeLo Green and the signature guitar runs of Carlos Santana). She was also nominated for Best R&B Song for "All That I Can Say", which she had written and produced for Mary J. Blige. Also, her concocted duet with Bob Marley on "Turn Your Lights Down Low" for the 1999 remix tribute album Chant Down Babylon additionally appeared in the 1999 film The Best Man and later received a Grammy nomination for Best Pop Collaboration with Vocals.

In November 1998, New Ark filed a fifty-page lawsuit against Hill, her management, and record label, claiming that Hill "used their songs and production skills, but failed to properly credit them for the work" on Miseducation. The musicians claimed to be the primary songwriters on two tracks, and major contributors on several others, though Gordon Williams, a prominent recorder, engineer, and mixer on Miseducation, described the album as a "powerfully personal effort by Hill" and said, "It was definitely her vision." Hill responded that New Ark had been appropriately credited and now were seeking to take advantage of her success. New Ark requested partial writing credits on most of the tracks on the album as well as monetary reimbursement. After many delays, depositions took place during the latter part of 2000. In part, the case illustrated the difficult boundaries between songwriting and all other aspects that went into contemporary arranging, sampling, and recording. The suit was eventually settled out of court in February 2001, with Hill paying New Ark a reported $5 million. A friend of Hill's later said of the suit, "That was the beginning of a chain effect that would turn everything a little crazy."

2000–2003: Self-imposed exile and MTV Unplugged No. 2.0
Hill began writing a screenplay about the life of Bob Marley, in the production of which she planned to play his wife Rita. She also began producing a romantic comedy about soul food with a working title of Sauce, and accepted a starring role in the film adaptation of Toni Morrison's novel Beloved; she later dropped out of both projects due to pregnancy. She also reportedly turned down acting roles in the remake for A Star Is Born (the movie was later released in 2018, with the part going to Lady Gaga), Dreamgirls (the role of Deena, later played by Beyoncé), Charlie's Angels (the part that went to Lucy Liu), The Bourne Identity, The Mexican, The Matrix Reloaded, and The Matrix Revolutions.

During 2000, Hill dropped out of the public eye. The pressures of fame began to overwhelm her. She disliked not being able to go out of her house to do simple errands without having to worry about her physical appearance. She fired her management team and began attending Bible study classes five days a week; she also stopped doing interviews, watching television and listening to music. She started associating with a "spiritual advisor" named Brother Anthony. Some familiar with Hill believe Anthony more resembled a cult leader than a spiritual advisor, and thought his guidance probably inspired much of Hill's more controversial public behavior.

She later described this period of her life to Essence saying "People need to understand that the Lauryn Hill they were exposed to in the beginning was all that was allowed in that arena at that time ... I had to step away when I realized that for the sake of the machine, I was being way too compromised. I felt uncomfortable about having to smile in someone's face when I really didn't like them or even know them well enough to like them." She also spoke about her emotional crisis, saying, "For two or three years I was away from all social interaction. It was a very introspective time because I had to confront my fears and master every demonic thought about inferiority, about insecurity or the fear of being black, young and gifted in this western culture." She went on to say that she had to fight to retain her identity, and was forced "to deal with folks who weren't happy about that."

In July 2001, while pregnant with her third child, Hill unveiled her new material to a small crowd, for a taping of an MTV Unplugged special. A live album of the concert, titled MTV Unplugged No. 2.0, was released in May 2002 and featured only her singing and playing an acoustic guitar. Unlike the near-unanimous praise of Miseducation, 2.0 sharply divided critics. AllMusic gave the album 4 out of 5 stars, saying that the recording "is the unfinished, unflinching presentation of ideas and of a person. It may not be a proper follow-up to her first album, but it is fascinating." Rolling Stone called the album "a public breakdown", and Robert Hilburn of the Los Angeles Times said the album's title opened Hill up for jokes that she had become unhinged. NME wrote that "Unplugged 2.0 is a sparse and often gruelling listen, but there is enough genius shading these rough sketches to suggest that all might not yet be lost." With the mixed reviews and no significant radio airplay, 2.0 debuted at No. 3 on the Billboard 200. The album was later certified Platinum in the US by the RIAA; and has received retrospective praise by music critics.

Her song "Mystery of Iniquity" from the album was nominated for a Grammy Award for Best Female Rap Solo Performance, and was used as an interpolation by hip-hop producer/songwriter Kanye West for his single "All Falls Down" featuring Syleena Johnson, leading to Hill being credited as a songwriter on the song.

Around 2001, Marley and Hill's third child, Joshua Omaru, was born. He was followed a year later by their fourth, John Nesta. While Hill sometimes had spoken of Marley as her husband, they never married, and along the way she was informed that Marley had been previously married at a young age. According to a 2003 Rolling Stone report, he had never secured a divorce. Marley later disputed this and made public to a blog a 1996 divorce document from Haiti. The two had been living in a high-end Miami hotel, but around 2003 she moved out into her own place in that city. Hill later said that she and Marley "have had long periods of separation over the years". Hill slowly worked on a new album and it was reported that by 2003, Columbia Records had spent more than $2.5 million funding it, including installing a recording studio in the singer's Miami apartment and flying different musicians around the country.

By 2002, Hill had shut down her non-profit Refugee Project. She said, "I had a nonprofit organization and I had to shut all that down. You know, smiling with big checks, obligatory things, not having things come from a place of passion. That's slavery. Everything we do should be a result of our gratitude for what God has done for us. It should be passionate."

In December 2003, Hill, during a performance in Vatican City, spoke of the "corruption, exploitation, and abuses" in reference to the molestation of boys by Catholic priests in the United States and the cover-up of offenses by Catholic Church officials. High-ranking church officials were in attendance, but Pope John Paul II was not present. The Catholic League called Hill "pathologically miserable" and claimed her career was "in decline". The following day, several reporters suggested that Hill's comments at the Vatican may have been influenced by her spiritual advisor, Brother Anthony.

2004–2009: Sporadic touring and recording

In 2004, Hill contributed a new song, "The Passion", to The Passion of the Christ: Songs. A remix version with John Legend of his "So High" ended up receiving a Grammy Award nomination for Best R&B Performance by a Duo or Group with Vocals. Around this time, Hill began selling a pay-per-view music video of the song "Social Drugs" through her website. Those who purchase the $15 video would only be able to view it three times before it expired. In addition to the video, Hill began selling autographed posters and Polaroids through her website, with some items listed at upwards of $500.

For the first time since 1997, the Fugees performed in September 2004 at Dave Chappelle's Block Party in the Bedford–Stuyvesant neighborhood of Brooklyn. The concert featured Hill's nearly a cappella rendition of "Killing Me Softly". The event was recorded by director Michel Gondry and was released on March 3, 2006, to universal acclaim. The Fugees also appeared at BET Awards 2005 during June 2005, where they opened the show with a 12-minute set. One track, "Take It Easy", was leaked online and thereafter was released as an Internet single in late September. It peaked at No. 40 on the Billboard R&B Chart.

In 2005, she told USA Today, "If I make music now, it will only be to provide information to my own children. If other people benefit from it, then so be it." When asked how she now felt about the songs on 2.0, she stated "a lot of the songs were transitional. The music was about how I was feeling at the time, even though I was documenting my distress as well as my bursts of joy."

The Fugees embarked on a European tour in late 2005. Old tensions between Hill and the other members of the group soon resurfaced, and the reunion ended before an album could be recorded; Jean and Michel both blamed Hill for the split. Hill reportedly demanded to be addressed by everyone, including her bandmates, as "Ms. Hill"; she also considered changing her moniker to "Empress". Hill's tardiness was also cited as a contributing factor.

Hill began touring on her own, although to mixed reviews; often arriving late to concerts (sometimes by over two hours), performing unpopular reconfigurations of her songs and sporting an exaggerated appearance. On some occasions, fans have booed her and left early. In June 2007, Sony Records said Hill had been recording through the past decade, had accumulated considerable unreleased material and had re-entered the studio with the goal of making a new album. Later that same year, an album titled Ms. Hill, which featured cuts from Miseducation, various soundtracks contributions and other "unreleased" songs, was released. It features guest appearances from D'Angelo, Rah Digga and John Forté. Also in June 2007, Hill released a new song, "Lose Myself", on the soundtrack to the film Surf's Up.

In early 2008, Marley and Hill's fifth child, Sara, was born. The couple were not living together, although Marley considered them "spiritually together" even while listing himself as single on social media. Hill later said that she and Marley "have [had] a long and complex history about which many inaccuracies have been reported since the beginning" and that they both valued their privacy. By August 2008, Hill was living with her mother and children in her hometown of South Orange, New Jersey.

Reports in mid-2008 claimed that Columbia Records then believed Hill to be on hiatus. Marley disputed these claims, telling an interviewer that Hill has enough material for several albums: "She writes music in the bathroom, on toilet paper, on the wall. She writes it in the mirror if the mirror smokes up. She writes constantly. This woman does not sleep". One of the few public appearances Hill made in 2008 was at a Martha Stewart book-signing in New Jersey, perplexing some in the press.

In April 2009, it was reported that Hill would engage in a 10-day tour of European summer festivals during mid-July of that year. She performed two shows for the tour and passed out on stage during the start of her second performance and left the stage. She refused to provide refunds for angry consumers. On June 10, Hill's management informed the promoters of the Stockholm Jazz Festival, which she was scheduled to headline, that she would not be performing due to unspecified "health reasons." Shortly afterward, the rest of the tour was canceled as well.

2010–present: Further activities and imprisonment
In January 2010, Hill returned to the live stage and performed in stops across New Zealand and Australia on the Raggamuffin Music Festival. Many of the songs that Hill had performed and recorded over the past six years were included on an April 2010 unofficial compilation album titled Khulami Phase. The album also features a range of other material found on the Ms. Hill compilation. Hill appeared at the Harmony Festival in Santa Rosa, California, in June 2010, her first live American performance in several years. An unreleased song called "Repercussions" was leaked via the Internet in late July 2010, debuting at No. 94 on Billboard's Hot R&B/Hip-Hop Songs (and peaked at No. 83 the following week), making it her first Billboard chart appearance as a lead artist since 1999.

Hill joined the Rock the Bells hip-hop festival series in the U.S. during August 2010, and as part of that year's theme of rendering classic albums, she performed The Miseducation of Lauryn Hill in its entirety for the first time. She increased the tempo and urgency from the original recording, but at times had difficulty in communicating with her band. Hill continued touring, including a set at the 6th Annual Jazz in the Gardens, in Miami Gardens, Florida in December. In Spring 2011, Hill performed at the Coachella Valley Music Festival, New Orleans Jazz Fest, and at the Cosmopolitan of Las Vegas. In July 2011, Hill gave birth to her sixth child, Micah, her first not with Rohan Marley; the father remains publicly unknown.

In February 2012, Hill performed a new song titled "Fearless Vampire Killer", during a sold-out performance at the Warner Theater in Washington, D.C. In late 2012, Hill toured with rapper Nas; her portion of the tour, titled Black Rage, is named after her song, released October 30. Hill has described the song as being "about the derivative effects of racial inequity and abuse" and "a juxtaposition to the statement 'life is good,' which she believes can only be so when these long standing issues are addressed and resolved."

In June 2012, Hill was charged with three counts of tax fraud or failing to file taxes (Title 26 USC § 7202 Willful failure to collect or pay over tax) not tax evasion on $1.8 million of income earned between 2005 and 2007. During this time she had toured as a musical artist, earned royalties from both her records and from films she had appeared in, and had owned and been in charge of multiple corporations. In a long post to her Tumblr, Hill said that she had gone "underground" and had rejected pop culture's "climate of hostility, false entitlement, manipulation, racial prejudice, sexism, and ageism." She added, "When I was working consistently without being affected by the interferences mentioned above, I filed and paid my taxes. This only stopped when it was necessary to withdraw from society, in order to guarantee the safety and well-being of myself and my family."

In June 2012, Hill appeared in the United States District Court for the District of New Jersey in Newark and pleaded guilty to the charges. Her attorney said she would make restitution for the back taxes she owed. By April 2013, Hill had paid back only $50,000 of the $554,000 she owed immediately. U.S. Magistrate Judge Madeline Cox Arleo criticized Hill, saying "This is not someone who stands before the court penniless. This is a criminal matter. Actions speak louder than words, and there has been no effort here to pay these taxes." Hill faced possible eviction from her rented home in South Orange as well as a civil lawsuit from the town for running a business out of a home without a zoning permit.

On May 4, 2013, Hill released her first official single in over a decade, "Neurotic Society (Compulsory Mix)". She later published a message on her Tumblr describing how she was "required to release [it] immediately, by virtue of the impending legal deadline." The release received some criticism for lyrics that appeared to tie societal decay to certain LGBT social movements. Hill responded that the song was not targeted at any particular group but was instead focused on anyone hiding behind neurotic behavior. Following a deal with Sony Music, which involves Hill creating a new record label within the company, Hill was said to be scheduled to release her first album in fifteen years during 2013.

On May 6, 2013, Hill was sentenced by Judge Arleo to serve three months in prison for failing to file taxes/tax fraud and three months' house arrest afterwards as part of a year of supervised probation. She had faced a possible sentence of as long as 36 months, and the sentence given took into account her lack of a prior criminal record and her six minor-aged children. By this point Hill had fully paid back $970,000 in back taxes and penalties she owed, which also took into account an additional $500,000 that Hill had in unreported income for 2008 and 2009. In the courtroom, Hill said that she had lived "very modestly" considering how much money she had made for others, and that "I am a child of former slaves who had a system imposed on them. I had an economic system imposed on me." Hill reported to the minimum-security Federal Correctional Institution, Danbury on July 8, 2013, to begin serving her sentence.

Hill was released from prison on October 4, 2013, a few days early for good behavior, and began her home confinement and probationary periods. She put out a single called "Consumerism" that she had finished, via verbal and e-mailed instructions, while incarcerated. Judge Arleo allowed her to postpone part of her confinement in order to tour in late 2013 under strict conditions.

During 2014, Hill was heard as the narrator of Concerning Violence, an award-winning Swedish documentary on the African liberation struggles of the 1960s and 1970s. She also continued to draw media attention for her erratic behavior, appearing late twice in the same day for sets at Voodoo Fest in November 2014.

In May 2015, Hill canceled her scheduled concert outside Tel Aviv in Israel following a social media campaign from activists promoting the Boycott, Divestment and Sanctions campaign. She said she had wanted to also perform a show in Ramallah in the West Bank but logistical problems had proved too great. Hill stated: "It is very important to me that my presence or message not be misconstrued, or a source of alienation to either my Israeli or my Palestinian fans."

Hill contributed her voice to the soundtrack for What Happened, Miss Simone?, a 2015 documentary about the life of Nina Simone, an American singer, pianist, and civil rights activist. Hill was originally supposed to record only two songs for the record, but ended up recording six. She also served as a producer on the compilation alongside Robert Glasper. Hill said of her connection to Simone: "Because I fed on this music ... I believed I always had a right to have a voice. Her example is clearly a form of sustenance to a generation needing to find theirs. What a gift." NPR critically praised Hill's performance on the soundtrack, stating: "This album mainly showcases Lauryn Hill's breadth and dexterity. Not formally marketed as Hill's comeback album, her six tracks here make this her most comprehensive set of studio recordings since The Miseducation of Lauryn Hill in 1998."

In April 2016, Hill hosted and headlined what was billed as the inaugural Diaspora Calling! festival at the Kings Theatre in Brooklyn. The festival's purpose was to showcase the efforts of musicians and artists from around the African diaspora like Brooklyn Haitian Rara band Brother High Full tempo. The following month, Hill was approximately 2 hours and 20 minutes late for her show at the Chastain Park Amphitheatre in Atlanta, though members of Hill's team claimed it was only an hour after their scheduled start time. Moments after the less-than-40-minute show ended due to the venue's strict 11:00 p.m. closing time, Hill said her driver had gotten lost and she could not help that. Less than 48 hours later, after a large backlash from her fans on Twitter, she took to her Facebook page and stated she was late for the concert because of certain needs, including her need to "align her energy with the time."

Hill recorded a studio version of her song, "Guarding the Gates", for the movie Queen & Slim which was released on November 27, 2019. She had been singing this song during live performances for several years prior to the recording for the movie. This song appears on the album, Queen & Slim: The Soundtrack.

Personal life 
Hill has six children, five of them with Rohan Marley, the son of reggae musician Bob Marley.

Legacy and impact

Hill is widely considered to be one of the greatest rappers of all time, and has often been called the greatest female rapper. The New York Times once referred to Hill as "the most popular woman in hip-hop". Rapper Kool Moe Dee gave Hill the highest score of any rapper on his rap 'Report Cards' list from the book, Ego Trip's Book of Rap Lists. Furthermore Beyoncé once stated that she is "one of the best hip-hop rappers ever". In 1998, Time declared her as the "Queen of Hip Hop". The Academy of Achievement, The Boston Globe, and Billboard, among others, have also crowned her with the same title. In 2015, Billboard named her the seventh greatest rapper of all time on their "10 Best Rappers of All Time" list, with Hill being the only female rapper on the list.

Music critic Brandon Tensley argued that "few artists have marked culture as profoundly as Hill did with her solo debut". In 2012, VH1 ranked Hill as one of the Greatest Woman in Music. In 2014, she was named the most influential woman in hip hop history by AllHipHop. Hill was also included on the NPR list of the '50 Great Voices'; and on the Consequence of Sound list of the 100 Greatest Singers of All Time. In 2019, Hill ranked No. 1 on the Ranker poll of the greatest singer/rappers. In 2023, Rolling Stone named her one of the 200 Greatest Singers of All Time. American Journalist Touré stated that "She was—she is—the greatest female MC of all time".

Musical impact 
With her solo music and work with Fugees, Hill is often credited as the artist who popularized the technique of blending rap and melodic singing together into one single song, sometimes referred to as melodic rap; this has since become popular, with many modern artists like Beyoncé, Drake, Nicki Minaj and Kanye West emulating it. Writing for The Ringer, author Musa Okwonga wrote "Decades before the ubiquity of the MC who could also croon, she could channel the greatness of Nina Simone and Rakim in the same set." In Complex, Andy Gee commented that "the modern music landscape is dominated by artists like Drake and Nicki Minaj, who fall in the Lauryn Hill archetype as traditionalist-appeasing MCs who have records where they’re singing their hearts out." XXL argued that "she set the bar high, not just for woman creators, but for anyone who wanted to rap or sing."

Former RIAA president Hilary Rosen, recognized Hill as a leading contributor to the blurring of lines that distinguished hip hop and R&B. Minaj alluded to Hill's impact on melodic rap on the song "Can Anybody Hear Me", where she mentions that prior to fame, Def Jam Recordings wouldn't sign her because she wanted to integrate rapping and singing on her album, but the record label told her she "wasn't Lauryn Hill". Lizzo who started her career as a rapper, later incorporated singing into her debut record. She stated in an interview in 2018, "I was always afraid of being a singer, but then when I heard Lauryn Hill, I was like, maybe I can do both", further adding that her debut album drew influence from The Miseducation of Lauryn Hill, "rapping, singing, being political". According to Da Brat, Hill's "sound shifted the whole game".

Billboard asserted in its 'The Lauryn Hill Effect' column that her early success was considered to be a breakthrough for female rappers. Author Nelson George noted, "the presence of women is increasing. The "Lauryn effect" is going to be very profound"; while Missy Elliott also added that "women are taking a stand and trying to get their foot in everything. Once the door's open for one, it's open for the next woman. Latifah opened the door for doing TV, and she might have opened it for Brandy. Now, it's open for everybody. This is just the beginning".

In 1999, a public survey was conducted by MTV, which directly impacted its programming. In the survey, she was ranked the most respected solo artist, and placed among the acts that participants thought best defined their generation; with former Viacom executive Todd Cunningham referring to Hill as a "massive phenomenon". Music journalist Danyel Smith credited Hill with reviving the hip hop genre, following the murders of The Notorious B.I.G. and Tupac Shakur.

Influence on other artists 

Hill has often been cited as one of the most influential entertainers of her generation. In 2021, Pitchfork named her as one of the 200 most influential artists since 1996. Many artists have named Lauryn Hill as an inspiration to their careers, including pop artists Adele, Beyoncé, Dua Lipa, Christina Aguilera, Britney Spears, Mumford & Sons, SZA, Doja Cat, H.E.R., P!nk, Kelly Clarkson; Babyface, rappers Kanye West, Jay-Z, Missy Elliott, Nicki Minaj, Nas, Lil' Kim, Brent Faiyaz, Rapsody; Afrobeats singers Tems, and Wizkid; and K-pop artists Jennie of Blackpink, CL of 2NE1, and RM of BTS.

Nicki Minaj has made mention of Hill's influence on her on multiple occasions; Including on 2020 US number one single "Say So Remix", In which Minaj raps, "Spittin' like Weezy, Foxy, plus Lauryn". Minaj has also referred to Hill as her idol and quoted the artist in her high school yearbook. John Legend attributes his early career success and his launch into the music industry to Hill, who gave him his first major opportunity as a pianist on the song "Everything Is Everything". Rapsody and Bebe Rexha have both cited Hill as their biggest musical inspiration, as well as UK grime rapper Stormzy naming her his biggest female musical influence.

Furthermore musicians Erykah Badu and Jazmine Sullivan have both mentioned her as their musical hero. In addition Kehlani has a tattoo of Hill on her arm. After performing with Hill, The Weeknd described the experience as the "most important experience of my life". During her 2018 Grammy award acceptance speech, Spanish singer Rosalía thanked her for being influential to her.

Music sampling 
Billboard stated that Hill "is to hip-hop as a gardener is to soil", and added that "the rapper/singer planted classic gems in her catalog — especially her pristine 1998 debut The Miseducation of Lauryn Hill — that have become samples for many rap game MVPs".

Her single "Doo Wop (That Thing)", was sampled by Drake (on the song "Draft Day"), Kanye West (on "Believe What I Say" from his album Donda), and interpolated by Lizzo (on the song "Break up Twice" from her album Special). In 2018, Hill became one of the most sampled artists of the year, when her single "Ex-Factor" was sampled on Cardi B's "Be Careful" and Drake's "Nice for What", while A$AP Rocky and Frank Ocean released "Purity" which sampled "I Gotta Find Peace of Mind". J. Cole's songs "Cole Summer" and "Can I Holla At Ya" from his EP Truly Yours, both contain samples of songs from The Miseducation of Lauryn Hill.

Additional sampling 
Hill's vocals from the her songs with the Fugees has been sampled or interpolated by countless artists, including Dj Khaled & Nas, Busta Rhymes, The Weeknd & Kendrick Lamar, Meek Mill, Jay-Z (on the song "Moonlight", from his 4:44 album), and Mariah Carey released (on the single "Save the Day", from her compilation album The Rarities). Furthermore, multiple artists have sampled Hill's songs from her live album MTV Unplugged No. 2.0 including Frank Ocean (on the Jazmine Sullivan-featured "Rushes" from his 2016 album Endless), Method Man ("Say"). and most notably Kanye West ("All Falls Down" featuring Syleena Johnson).

Film and stage 
The Broadway musical Hamilton was heavily influenced by Hill, with creator Lin-Manuel Miranda naming Hill as his favorite rapper, and referencing Hill's single "Lost Ones" on the song "We Know", and Hill's verse from the Fugees single "Ready or Not", on the song "Helpless" from the musical. The Simpsons episode "The Miseducation of Lisa Simpson" was titled after Hill's debut solo album. The BET network series Tales, episode "Ex-Factor", was based on and titled after Hill's single of the same name. Film director Gina Prince-Bythewood stated that she was also inspired by "Ex-Factor" and Hill, when she was shooting the movie Love & Basketball (2000). Actress Alexa Demie mentioned that she drew inspiration from Hill's song "To Zion" for her role in the HBO drama series Euphoria.

Fashion and endorsements

Endorsements 
In 1999, Hill partnered with Levi Strauss & Co. to create custom outfits for her Miseducation Tour. The partnership ushered in a new generation of black musicians partnerships with major brands, with journalist Thembisa Mshaka of Okayplayer proclaiming "when Levi Strauss put its name next to Lauryn Hill, a new course was charted. The Fortune 500 brand partnerships with black musicians that are ubiquitous today were seeded by the success of Lauryn's solo debut". A custom ensemble made for Hill by Levi's was put on display during the Levi Strauss: A History of American Style exhibit at the Contemporary Jewish Museum.

Influence on hair and beauty 
Well known for styling her hair in locs, braids, bantu knots and afros, Hill is often associated with the revival of the natural hair movement. She has been credited as one of the people who’ve helped normalize locs, and introduced them to pop culture. Author Joan Morgan noted that "for a young person who was growing up in the '90s and liked that natural look but didn't want to identify as Rasta, there was really no example until Lauryn Hill." Hill is also frequently listed among the people who've defined modern bantu knots and afros. Ebony noted that she "helped to usher in a new standard of beauty for Black women -one grounded in the richness and authenticity of their African heritage."

PopSugar placed her on their list of the '18 Moments in Hair History That Changed the World', and wrote "When searching for the originator in the recent natural hair revival, you must look to Lauryn Hill. She emerged as the feminine lead in The Fugees and broke Grammy records as a soloist, all while popularizing dreadlocks in the mainstream." Stylist mentioned Hill gracing the cover of Time in locs, and being named on of People's 50 Most Beautiful People in 1999, as one of the most definitive moments in the history of black hair.

In an interview with Vogue, R&B singer SZA, stated "The only girl that I could look to for natural hair inspiration growing up was Lauryn Hill." According to celebrity hairstylist Yusef Williams, who styled Rihanna's hair on the set of Ocean's 8, the singer "channeled her inner Lauryn Hill" while wearing locs for her role in the movie. Halle Bailey named Hill as one of her beauty icons, while mentioning "I love Lauryn Hill's hair".

Impact on fashion 
In 2015, Vogue mentioned her as one of the female hip hop entertainers of 1990s, whose style they considered to be influential to 2010s fashion, with Emily Barasch of Vogue, writing "Lauryn Hill's sense of style endures today, as nineties nostalgia continues to pervade the runways." She was hailed as a "fashion and music icon" by CR Fashion Book and was also included on the list of the most stylish rappers of all time by Complex.

She is often named as a leading contributor in the modern popularization of the hoop earring, which first grew in popularity among black women in the 1970s, before reaching a wider audience after female hip hop artists like Hill wore them in the 1980s and 1990s. Considered as an inspiration for Kanye West's fashion; R&B singer Solange also cited Hill among her style influences in an interview for Fashionista.

Influence on fashion designers 
British fashion designer John Galliano chose Hill as his muse for the 2000 Spring/Summer Dior collection, he designed; The Hill-inspired collection featured models wearing dreadlocks and hoop earrings, and introduced the Dior 'Saddle Bag', which was made famous by the character Carrie Bradshaw in the television series Sex and the City; and according to Who What Wear, it is one of the ten most popular designer handbags ever. In 2017, the hip hop-based collection designed by Alexander Wang, as well as Tory Burch's resort collection, were both inspired by Hill.

The Men's Spring/Summer 2021 Louis Vuitton collection designed by Virgil Abloh, drew influence from Hill, with Abloh mentioning Hill as his "forever muse". Hill later performed at Abloh's memorial service after he died from a rare form of cancer in December 2021. She was also named among Daniel Roseberry's influences for the Spring/Summer 2022 Schiaparelli collection. Designers Esteban Cortazar, Kerby Jean-Raymond of Pyer Moss, and Humberto Leon of Kenzo, and Demna Gvasalia of Balenciaga, have also noted her as an inspiration.

Achievements

Hill has won numerous accolades throughout her career, including eight Grammy Awards (including Album of the Year), the most won by a female rapper, five MTV Video Music Awards (including Video of the Year), four NAACP Image Awards (including the President's Award), four Guinness World Records, and three American Music Awards. In 2021, she was among the inaugural nominees for the Black Music & Entertainment Walk of Fame, and was inducted in 2022.

Hill won the Grammy Award for Best Rap Album as a member of The Fugees, for their album The Score, becoming the first woman to win the award. The Score peaked at No. 1 on the Billboard 200 chart, making Hill the first female rapper to top the chart as a member of The Fugees; her first solo studio album, The Miseducation of Lauryn Hill, also peaked at No. 1, making Hill the first solo female hip hop act to reach No. 1 on that chart. The album sold more than 422,000 copies in its first week, which had broke the record previously held by Madonna, for highest first-week sales by a female artist. Both The Miseducation of Lauryn Hill and its lead single "Doo Wop (That Thing)" debuted at No. 1 in the US, making Hill the first act to have debuted at No. 1 on both the Billboard 200 and Hot 100 with their first entries on each chart. The album also topped the Billboard Year-End Top R&B/Hip-Hop Albums chart, making it the only album by a female artist to accomplish this feat.

At the 41st Annual Grammy Awards, Hill received ten Grammy Award nominations and won five that night, including Album of the Year, with The Miseducation of Lauryn Hill being the first Hip hop album to win the award. She also set the record for most nominations for a female artist in one night, broke the record at the time previously set by Carole King for the most wins by a female artist in one night, and became the first female rapper to win the Best New Artist award. Furthermore, she also became the first black solo act to win MTV Video Music Award for Video of the Year at the 1999 MTV Video Music Awards.

In 1999, following the success of her first solo album, Hill landed on the cover of Time magazine, being the only black musician to land on the cover during that decade. With The Miseducation of Lauryn Hill, she became a pioneer in the neo soul movement, when the album was one of the first in the genre to achieve mainstream success, and became the best-selling neo soul album of all time. The album has also been inducted into the Library of Congress. NPR ranked it 2nd on its list of "The 150 Greatest Albums Made by Women". Rolling Stone listed it as the 10th-Greatest Album of All Time, on their 500 Greatest Albums of All Time list, in 2020.

In 2021, The Miseducation of Lauryn Hill was certified Diamond by the Recording Industry Association of America(RIAA), making Hill the first female hip hop artist to ever receive a Diamond certification in the United States. That same year, Rolling Stone placed her single "Doo Wop (That Thing)" and the Fugees version of "Killing Me Softly" on their revised list of the 500 Greatest Songs. The Smithsonian National Museum of African American History and Culture included "Doo Wop (That Thing)" on their Anthology of Hip-Hop and Rap box set.

Along with having a successful music career as a member of The Fugees and as a solo artist, Hill also achieved success as a songwriter and producer for other artists. Hill has written songs for Aretha Franklin, Mary J. Blige, CeCe Winans and produced songs for Whitney Houston and Santana, among others. In 2015, she received the Golden Note Award from American Society of Composers, Authors and Publishers(ASCAP); while additionally winning songwriting awards for her songwriting credits on Drake's "Nice for What", Aretha Franklin's "A Rose Is Still a Rose", Cardi B's "Be Careful", Mary J. Blige's "All That I Can Say", and Kanye West's "All Falls Down".

Discography

 The Miseducation of Lauryn Hill (1998)

Filmography

Tours
 Smokin' Grooves Tour (with Fugees, Cypress Hill, Ziggy Marley, A Tribe Called Quest, Busta Rhymes and Spearhead) (1996)
 Refugee Camp Tour (with Fugees) (1997)
 The Miseducation Tour (1999)
 Smokin' Grooves Tour (with The Roots and Outkast) (2002)
 Reunion Tour (with Fugees) (2005)
 Moving Target: Extended Intimate Playdate Series Tour (2011)
 Life Is Good / Black Rage Tour (with Nas) (2012)
 Homecoming Tour (2013-2014)
 Small Axe Tour (2015)
 MLH Caravan: A Diaspora Calling! Tour (2016-2017)
 PowerNomics Tour (with Nas) (2017)
 The Miseducation of Lauryn Hill 20th Anniversary World Tour (2018-2019)
 Ms. Lauryn Hill Live in Concert (2020)

See also 
 List of artists who reached number one in the United States

References

External links

 
 
 
 Lauryn Hill at MTV
 Lauryn Hill at Pitchfork
 Lauryn Hill at NPR

 
1975 births
Living people
20th-century American actresses
20th-century American singers
20th-century American women singers
21st-century American actresses
21st-century American rappers
21st-century American singers
21st-century American women singers
African-American actresses
African-American women rappers
African-American women singers
American women rappers
American film actresses
American contemporary R&B singers
American neo soul singers
American people convicted of tax crimes
American prisoners and detainees
American soap opera actresses
American tax resisters
American television actresses
Columbia High School (New Jersey) alumni
Columbia University alumni
Alternative hip hop musicians
Fugees members
Feminist musicians
Grammy Award winners for rap music
Musicians from East Orange, New Jersey
People from East Orange, New Jersey
People from South Orange, New Jersey
Rappers from New Jersey
Rappers from Newark, New Jersey
African American female guitarists
21st-century women rappers